Domitius is a genus of European scaffold web spiders first described by C. Ribera in 2018.

Species
 it contains seven species:
Domitius baeticus (López-Pancorbo & Ribera, 2011) — Spain
Domitius luquei (Ribera & Guerao, 1995) — Spain
Domitius lusitanicus (Fage, 1931) — Portugal
Domitius menozzii (Caporiacco, 1934) — Italy
Domitius murgis (Ribera & De Mas, 2003) — Spain
Domitius sbordonii (Brignoli, 1979) — Italy
Domitius speluncarum (Pavesi, 1873) — Italy

References

Araneomorphae genera
Nesticidae